Through Fire is an American rock band from Omaha, Nebraska, founded in 2015 by songwriter, guitarist and producer Justin McCain and currently consists of McCain, vocalist Grant Joshua Kendrick, and twins Tyler and Zach Halverson on bass and drums respectively. They signed a deal with Sumerian Records and released their debut record in 2016. Their debut single "Stronger" reached number 29 on the mainstream rock chart.

History
In December 2015 Justin McCain, the founder of Emphatic, announced his new band "Through Fire", with Grant Joshua Kendrick on vocals, Patrick Mussack on drum, and Jesse Saint on bass. He also announced that a new album will be released in 2016. Through Fire embarked on tour with Adelitas Way for Jan/Feb 2016, a tour with Nonpoint July/Aug 2016, and have scheduled a Fall run with Sick Puppies for Sept/Oct 2016. "Stronger" was the official theme to WWE's Backlash 2016 Pay Per View.

The band announced signing to Sumerian and debuted the music video to their first single as Through Fire,  "Stronger", on January 29, 2016. It was released on iTunes on February 5, 2016. and reached #1 on iTunes, as well as #1 on Octane. Stronger was aired on the Stanley Cup Finals and was also used in the trailer for the 2016 action, drama film Fight Valley featuring former UFC champions Miesha Tate, Holly Holm & Cyborg.

The band's debut album Breathe was released on July 1, 2016, and debuted at #4 on Billboard's Heatseekers Albums chart.

Saint switched from bass to rhythm guitar in 2015, and the band recruited Kyle Leblanc to fill his former role. This lineup lasted for about five months before Saint and Mussack both departed the group. The band returned to a four piece with the addition Grant Brooks.

The band released their second studio album, All Animal on July 19, 2019 and reached #11 on the U.S. Heatseekers and #36 on U.S. Independents.

Brooks would leave the band towards the end of 2021 to join Fozzy. Soon after, Leblanc would also depart and the band would bring in brothers Tyler and Zach Halverson on bass and drums on August 4, 2022, marking the current lineup of the group. The next day, on August 5, the band announced a tour with the lineup with Drowning Pool called Strike a Nerve Tour.

Discography

Studio albums

Singles

Promotional Singles

Music videos

Band members
Members

Justin McCain – lead guitar, backing vocals (2015–present)
Grant Joshua Kendrick – lead vocals (2015–present)
Tyler Halverson – bass, backing vocals (2022–present)
Zach Halverson – drums, percussion (2022–present)

Former members
Patrick Mussack – drums, percussion (2015–2017)
Jesse Saint – bass, backing vocals (2015–2017) rhythm guitar (2017)
Grant Brooks – drums, percussion (2017–2021)
Kyle LeBlanc – bass, backing vocals (2017–2022)

Timeline

References

External links

American post-grunge musical groups
Musical groups from Omaha, Nebraska